The St. George's Episcopal Church in Austin, Nevada, United States, located at 156 Main St., is a historic Gothic Revival-style church built during 1877–78.  It was listed on the National Register of Historic Places in 2003.

It is a one-story brick building, with the bricks laid in American bond, with lancet arch windows, set on a terrace in Pony Canyon, with a corner bell tower dominating.  It was reportedly designed by a San Francisco architect, and built by local contractor Michael Finnegan with mason John C. Wholey.  It is significant as "one of Austin, Nevada's most stylish nineteenth century buildings", and as the only historic church in Austin that was still, in 2003, in use by its original denomination.

References 

Episcopal church buildings in Nevada
Gothic Revival church buildings in Nevada
Churches in Lander County, Nevada
Churches on the National Register of Historic Places in Nevada
Churches completed in 1878
19th-century Episcopal church buildings
National Register of Historic Places in Lander County, Nevada
Austin, Nevada